The Black Building at 114-118 Broadway in Fargo, North Dakota was a "pivotal" historic resource in the Downtown Fargo District, in the listing of that historic district upon the National Register of Historic Places.  In 2016 it was also individually listed on the National Register, as its "owners chose to pursue the honor of individual listing for its architecture and for its association with George Mumford Black and his strategies in commerce and communications. Black had the upper floor of the Art Moderne building designed for WDAY (AM) radio and ensured the station signed off each show with “this is WDAY with from the Black Building, Fargo” and he is credited with creating the one-cent sale."

Architecture
The Black Building is in Art Moderne style.  At eight stories tall, it was the tallest in the district.  "Faced with Indiana limestone, it also deviates from the predominant brick in the district. The Black building was the work of Lang,
Raugland, and Lewis of Minneapolis with Ole A. Braseth and S. Marius Houkom, consulting Fargo architects. Oscar Lang (1880-1960) and his partners designed the Art Moderne Greyhound bus depot (1936-7) in Minneapolis, the library at St. Olaf College in Northfield, Minnesota, and a series of churches, schools, and commercial buildings in Minnesota.*9 The Black building (#8) may have inspired the Art Moderne refacing and reconstruction by Braseth and Houkom in 1940 of two other buildings on Broadway: (#38) the Gate City Block at 71-3 and (#33) the building at 202-204 in warm cream-colored ashlar."

History
Norman B. Black, a leading North Dakota businessman and newspaper publisher arrived in North Dakota in 1905, where he became manager of the Grand Forks Herald and the Evening Times, until he purchased the Fargo Forum in 1917. In addition to publishing the Forum, Black, in 1920, became president of the Minot Daily News. His influence grew through the newspaper business and Black served two terms as president of the North Dakota Press Association. The Black building (#8) at 114-18 Broadway was erected by and named for him."

The building was purchased in 2015.  There was a municipal bond issue failure associated with the building.

References

National Register of Historic Places in Cass County, North Dakota
Streamline Moderne architecture in the United States

Buildings and structures in Fargo, North Dakota
Office buildings on the National Register of Historic Places
Individually listed contributing properties to historic districts on the National Register in North Dakota